Sotonera Lacus is one of a number of hydrocarbon lakes found on Saturn's largest moon, Titan.

Sotonera Lacus is located near the north pole of Titan, centered on latitude 76.75°N and longitude 17.49°W, and measures 63 km in length. It is situated in a north polar region where the majority of Titan's large lakes are found.

The lake is composed of liquid methane and ethane, and was detected by the space probe Cassini. It was named in 2007 after Lake Sotonera in Spain.

Notes

References

External links
 USGS labelled synthetic aperture radar map of Titan's north polar region

Lakes of Titan (moon)